HMS Trincomalee  was a sloop of Dutch or French origin that the British Royal Navy took into service in 1799. She was destroyed in action in 1799 with the loss of all but two of her crew.

Career
The Navy commissioned Trincomalee under the command of Commander John Rowe. 
An Arab Dow arrived at Bombay on 6 December 1799, from Muscat. She brought information from Mr. Manesty, the British East India Company's (EIC) Resident at Bassorah. He reported that Trincomalee had been dispatched from Muscat to intercept two French ships in the Gulf of Persia that had captured Mr. Manesty's ship Pearl, on 7 October. Pearl had been carrying three lakh rupees (750,000 francs), 40 horses, 5000 "saumons de cuivre", and other cargo. In the engagement on 7 October in which Iphigénie captured Pearl, Captain Fowler of Pearl and five of her crew were killed, and a number of men wounded before she struck. Her captor then removed the bullion and cargo from Pearl, and then decided to sail for Mauritius.

Trincomalee set out in company with the Bombay Marine's cruizer Comet. They were cruising in the Bab-el-Mandeb when just before midnight on 12 October they encountered two vessels, the French privateer Iphigénie, Captain Jean-François Malroux du Bac, and her prize, Pearl. Trincomalee challenged them, but they did not respond and instead sailed away. The next morning the two British ships spotted them and gave chase, catching up with their quarry.

An action ensued at about 11a.m. with Trincomalee engaging Iphigénie and Comet engaging Pearl. The exchange of fire lasted about two hours when suddenly Trincomalee exploded. She was so close to Iphigénie that the explosion knocked down Iphigénies main and mizzen masts and ruptured her sides, with the result that she soon started to founder.

Comet and Pearl broke off their engagement and picked up the few survivors. There were about 30-40 survivors from Iphigénie;  Malroux du Bac drowned, apparently while trying to retrieve documents aboard his ship. Pearls original crew had also been on board Iphigénie. Only two men from Trincomalee, a seaman and a lascar, survived. 

Pearl and Comet did not renew their engagement, instead sailing off in different directions, Pearl with the survivors from Iphigénie. Comet landed the two men from Trincomalee at Muscat. Pearl arrived at Muscat on 15 October to replenish her water. There the captain of Pearls prize crew freed John Carmlington, an officer from Pearl who had survived despite being on Iphigénie, on 24 October, the day Pearl sailed.

Notes, citations, and references
Notes

Citations

References
 
Epinay, Adrien d'. (1890) Renseignements pour servir à l'histoire de l'Île de France jusqu'à l'année 1810: inclusivement; précédés de notes sur la découverte de l'île, sur l'occupation hollandaise, etc. (Imprimerie Dupuy).
 
 
 
Parkinson, Cyril Northcote (1954) War in the Eastern Seas, 1793-1815. (George Allen & Unwin). 
  

1790s ships
Captured ships
Sloops of the Royal Navy